Blanca María Villaseñor Gudiño (born 28 September 1963) is a Mexican politician affiliated with the PRI. As of 2013 she served as Deputy of the LXII Legislature of the Mexican Congress representing Michoacán.

References

1963 births
Living people
Politicians from Michoacán
Women members of the Chamber of Deputies (Mexico)
Institutional Revolutionary Party politicians
21st-century Mexican politicians
21st-century Mexican women politicians
Deputies of the LXII Legislature of Mexico
Members of the Chamber of Deputies (Mexico) for Michoacán